Boulounga is a town in the Bourzanga Department of Bam Province in northern Burkina Faso. In 1996 it had a population of 2, 296.

References

External links
Satellite map at Maplandia.com

Populated places in the Centre-Nord Region
Bam Province